Thamnaconus is a genus of filefishes native to the Indian and Pacific Oceans.

Species
There are about 13 recognized species in this genus:
 Thamnaconus analis (Waite, 1904) 
 Thamnaconus arenaceus (Barnard, 1927) (Sandy filefish)
 Thamnaconus degeni (Regan, 1903) (Degen's leatherjacket)
 Thamnaconus fajardoi (J. L. B. Smith, 1953) (Spotted filefish)
 Thamnaconus fijiensis (Hutchins & Matsuura, 1984)
 Thamnaconus garrettii Fowler, 1928
 Thamnaconus hypargyreus (Cope, 1871) (Lesser-spotted leatherjacket)
 Thamnaconus melanoproctes (Boulenger, 1889) (Blackvent filefish)
 Thamnaconus modestoides (Barnard, 1927) (Modest filefish)
 Thamnaconus modestus (Günther, 1877) (Black scraper)	
 Thamnaconus paschalis (Regan, 1913) (Easter filefish)
 Thamnaconus septentrionalis (Günther, 1874)
 Thamnaconus tessellatus (Günther, 1880) (Tessellated leatherjacket)

References

Monacanthidae
Taxa named by J. L. B. Smith
Marine fish genera